Morphine methylbromide (Morphine methobromide, Morphine bromomethylate, Morphosan) a derivative of morphine.  It is an opioid listed as a Schedule I Narcotic with an ACSCN of 9305 and a 2014 aggregate national production quota of 5 grams.  It is a salt of morphine with a freebase conversion ratio of 0.75.controlled substance.

References

Opioids
Quaternary ammonium compounds
Bromides